Veronica anagallis-aquatica is a species of flowering plant in the family Plantaginaceae known by the common names water speedwell, blue water-speedwell,brook pimpernel, and sessile water-speedwell. It is also listed as Veronica catenata.
Its true native range is not clear, but the plant is present on most continents, and in most places it is probably naturalized. It occurs in many types of moist and wet habitat, and it is semi-aquatic, often growing in shallow water along streambanks, in ponds, and in other wetland environments. It is a rhizomatous perennial herb with stems growing 10 centimeters to about a meter in maximum length. It may be decumbent, the stem spreading along the ground and rooting where it touches moist substrate, or erect in form. The oppositely arranged leaves are green, smooth-edged or toothed, and sometimes clasping the stem where the leaf pairs meet at the bases. The inflorescence is a raceme of many flowers arising from the leaf axils. Each flower is borne on a short, curving pedicel. The flower corolla is up to a centimeter wide with four lobes, the upper lobe being widest. It is blue, lavender, or violet with purple lines near the base of each lobe. At the center are two small protruding stamens.

Conservation status in the United States
It is listed as threatened in Indiana, and as endangered in Massachusetts, New Jersey, and Tennessee.

References

External links
Jepson Manual Treatment
Washington Burke Museum
Illinois Wildflowers

anagallis-aquatica
Flora of Asia
Flora of Europe
Flora of North America
Flora of South America
Flora of Africa
Plants described in 1753
Taxa named by Carl Linnaeus
Freshwater plants